The Shenzhen Tong is a reusable contactless stored value smartcard used for electronic payments in public transportation and some other areas in Shenzhen city, Guangdong Province, People's Republic of China. It was developed by Shenzhen Modern Computer, the provider of automatic fare collection systems to Shenzhen Metro, with cooperation from Octopus Cards Limited, the operator of Hong Kong's Octopus cards system. It was first adopted by minibuses in Shenzhen, until the new system was introduced by Shenzhen Metro. The English name was originally TransCard.

Starting from January 18, 2006, Shenzhen Tong was gradually accepted by public buses to replace the old IC card system by Shenzhen Bus. All routes operated by Shenzhen Bus Group, Shenzhen Eastern Bus, Shenzhen Western Bus and most other private buses operators accept Shenzhen Tong cards.

Shenzhen Tong card can be purchased for RMB20 (Sale Version Card) deposit. A combined Shenzhen Tong and Hong Kong Octopus card is available, called the Hu Tong Xing, with RMB & HKD in different purses. Infineon Technologies announced it has won a contract to be the sole supplier of contactless microprocessor chips for Shenzhen Tong cards. Issuance unit volume of these cards is expected to exceed three million by the end of 2008. In January 2018, the Shenzhen Tong+ WeChat mini program was launched, allowing users to pay fares with QR codes.

Types of cards

 Rent Version Card
 Sale Version Card
 Special Preferential Card
 Bank Co-Branded Card
 Memorial Card
 Corporation Bardian Card
 Mini Card
 Mobile phone Shenzhen Tong (CMCC, China Telecom, China Unicom)
 Hu Tong Xing (互通行, hù tōng xíng, literal meaning Interoperable Pass Card;  Shenzhen Tong - Octopus Card 2 in 1 Co-Branded Card with RMB & HKD in different purses)
 China T-union card

Cards Gallery

See also 
 Electronic money
 List of smart cards
 Octopus card (Hong Kong)

References

External links 
 Official website
 Shenzhen Tong Overview, Conditions of Issue of Shenzhen Tong, FAQ

Shenzhen
Contactless smart cards
Transport in Shenzhen
Fare collection systems in China